Yutaka Takagi (born 13 July 1960) is a Japanese sailor. He competed in the 470 event at the 1984 Summer Olympics.

References

External links
 

1960 births
Living people
Japanese male sailors (sport)
Olympic sailors of Japan
Sailors at the 1984 Summer Olympics – 470
Place of birth missing (living people)